Eupithecia elquiensis is a moth in the family Geometridae. It is found the Region of Coquimbo (El Qui Province) in Chile. The habitat consists of the Coquimban Desert Biotic Province.

The length of the forewings is about 9.5 mm for females. The forewings are creamy white, with scattered dark grey and greyish black scales. The veins have pale brown scaling. The hindwings are slightly paler than the forewings, they do not have the scattered dark scaling. Adults have been recorded on wing in October.

Etymology
The specific name is based on the type locality.

References

Moths described in 1991
elquiensis
Moths of South America
Endemic fauna of Chile